ABH, or abh, may refer to:
 Abh, a Latin-script trigraph used in Irish to write the sound /əu̯/, or in Donegal, /oː/, between broad consonants.
 ABH, the IATA code for Alpha Airport, Queensland, Australia
 abh, the ISO 639-3 code for the Central Asian Arabic language
 ABH, the National Rail code for Abererch railway station, Wales, UK
 Assault occasioning actual bodily harm, an offence in English law
 Aviation boatswain's mate, handling, a US Navy occupational rating
 A Barbadian's Head on the flag of pirate Bartholomew Roberts

See also